The president of Kyrgyzstan, officially the president of the Kyrgyz Republic, is the head of state and head of government of the Kyrgyz Republic. The president directs the executive branch of the national government, is the commander-in-chief of the Kyrgyz military and also heads the National Security Council.

The president, according to the constitution, "is the symbol of the unity of people and state power, and is the guarantor of the Constitution of the Kyrgyz Republic, and of an individual and citizen."

The office of president was established in 1990 replacing the Chairman of the Supreme Soviet that existed, in different forms, from 1936 whilst the country was known as the Kirghiz Soviet Socialist Republic.

The first popularly elected officeholder was Askar Akayev, who served from October 1990 until 24 March 2005. In July 2005, Kurmanbek Bakiyev was elected. He was re-elected in 2009, but large riots in April 2010 forced him to resign and flee the country.  Roza Otunbayeva was selected in April 2010 to head the interim government. She was officially inaugurated on 3 July 2010, as president for a limited term, until elections could be organised. Her successor, Almazbek Atambayev, was elected in the 2011 Kyrgyzstani presidential election and subsequently succeeded Otunbayeva on 1 December that year.

On 16 October 2017, Sooronbay Jeenbekov, the former prime minister, was elected president of the country. He took office on 24 November 2017. On 15 October 2020, Jeenbekov resigned following unrest over the parliamentary elections on 4 October. Jeenbekov was succeeded by Prime Minister Sadyr Japarov, who became acting president before being confirmed as president on 16 October.

Sadyr Japarov is the 6th and current president of Kyrgyzstan, who has held the office since 28 January 2021.

Oath of office
On assuming office, the president raises his/her right arm and puts it on the Kyrgyz Constitution while reciting the following oath:

Russian Translation:

English Translation:

Election

Qualifications
The office of president is open to all citizens of Kyrgyzstan who are no younger than 35 years of age, and no older than 65 years of age. A candidate must have a command of the state language, and have resided in the republic for no less than 15 years before the nomination of his or her candidacy for the position. The president cannot be a deputy of the Jogorku Kenesh (Parliament), occupy other positions, or carry out entrepreneurial activities, and must suspend activity in political parties and organizations for their period in office.

On taking office the president must take the following oath, stipulated by Article 45 of the constitution, within 30 days of election before the assembled members of the legislative chamber:

Electoral law
The president is elected by the citizens of Kyrgyzstan by a majority of votes cast. These elections are held on the basis of universal suffrage, and by secret ballot. To become a candidate a person must obtain the signatures of fifty thousand registered voters.

For an election to be considered valid the turnout must not be lower than fifty percent. Similarly, if a candidate wins the backing of fifty percent of the voters who participated they are the winner. Should no candidate win an outright majority in the first round, the two candidates with the highest number of votes face each other in a second ballot.

Inauguration ceremony
The Inauguration ceremony of the president of Kyrgyzstan is a ceremony that takes place to mark the start of a new term for the president of Kyrgyzstan.

List of inaugural ceremonies

Residences

 State residence №1 (Ala Archa State Residence) 
 State residence №2 (Cholpon-Ata State Residence)
 South Residence
 Jalal-Abad State Residence

Duties and functions

The head of state holds significant power as provided for in the constitution. This states that they have the authority to:

Appoint the Prime Minister and other members of government
Present candidates to Parliament for positions within the Supreme Court
Direct foreign policy
Present and sign law
Announce all elections and enact decrees
Act as the commander-in-chief of the Armed Forces of Kyrgyzstan

Presidential appointments
 Prime Minister of Kyrgyzstan 
 Cabinet ministers
 Procurator General of Kyrgyzstan
 Chairperson of the State Committee for National Security
 Chairperson of the State Border Guard Service
 Chairperson of the State Customs Service
 Chairperson of the State Forensic Experts Service
 Chairperson of the State Penitentiary Service
 Chairperson of the State Service for Combating Economic Crimes
 Chairperson of the National Bank of Kyrgyzstan
 Chief of the General Staff of Armed Forces
 Commanders of the different service branches 
 Members of the Supreme Court of Kyrgyzstan 
 Head of the Presidential Administration
 Press secretary
 Ambassadors of Kyrgyzstan

Impeachment
The president may be dismissed from office by Parliament only on the basis of a charge made by the Legislative Assembly of state treason or another grievous crime supported by a ruling of the Constitutional Court. Such a decision requires the support of two-thirds of the Jogorku Kenesh who are immediately dismissed should the president be found innocent.

Succession
If the president becomes unable to carry out their duties for reasons such as death, illness or impeachment, the prime minister shall carry out their duties until the election of a new head of state. This must take place within three months of the termination of their Presidency. Kyrgyzstan has only had one peaceful transition of power from president to president (in 2017). Askar Akayev was forced from office by the Tulip Revolution of 2005 and Kurmanbek Bakiyev was forced from office by the Kyrgyz Revolution of 2010. Almazbek Atambayev was peacefully succeeded by Sooronbay Jeenbekov in 2017.  However, Jeenbekov resigned from office due to the 2020 Kyrgyzstani protests and was succeeded by Sadyr Japarov.

List of Presidents of Kyrgyzstan
The first column consecutively numbers the individuals who have served as president, while the second column consecutively numbers the Presidential terms or administrations.

See also
Prime Minister of Kyrgyzstan
Vice President of Kyrgyzstan
Leadership of Communist Kyrgyzstan
Security Council of Kyrgyzstan

References

External links
Official webpage

Politics of Kyrgyzstan
Government of Kyrgyzstan
 
K
Lists of Kyrgyzstani politicians
1990 establishments in the Kirghiz Soviet Socialist Republic